Bakhodir Kurbanov (born 5 December 1972) is a retired Greco-Roman wrestler from Uzbekistan. He competed at the 1996 and 2000 Summer Olympics in the featherweight (-62 kg) and lightweight (-63 kg), respectively, and finished in 16th and fifth place. He won a bronze and a silver medal at the 1994 and 1998 Asian Games, respectively, and finished fourth in 2002.

Family
Kurbanov is the youngest of five brothers, all wrestlers. In December 1997 he married Oksana Chusovitina, an Olympic gymnast from Uzbekistan whom he met at the 1994 Asian Games in Japan. The marriage was opposed by Chusovitina's Orthodox Christian parents because Kurbanov is a Muslim. Their son Alisher was born in November 1999, and in late 2002 he was diagnosed with acute lymphocytic leukemia. In search for qualified treatment the family moved to Cologne, Germany, and used fundraisers and donations from gymnastics fans to pay for medical bills. In 2006, Chusovitina received German citizenship. After completing medical treatment Bakhodir and Alisher returned to Uzbekistan, though Chusovitina plans to brings them back to Germany.

References

External links
 

1972 births
Living people
People from Samarqand Region
Wrestlers at the 1996 Summer Olympics
Wrestlers at the 2000 Summer Olympics
Uzbekistani male sport wrestlers
Olympic wrestlers of Uzbekistan
Asian Games medalists in wrestling
Wrestlers at the 1994 Asian Games
Wrestlers at the 1998 Asian Games
Wrestlers at the 2002 Asian Games
Asian Games silver medalists for Uzbekistan
Asian Games bronze medalists for Uzbekistan
Medalists at the 1994 Asian Games
Medalists at the 1998 Asian Games
Spartak athletes